Nizhniye Korobki is a rural locality (a selo) in Popkovskoye Rural Settlement, Kotovsky District, Volgograd Oblast, Russia. The population was 252 as of 2010. There are 5 streets.

Geography 
Nizhniye Korobki is located in steppe, on Volga Upland, on the right bank of the Lomovka River, 27 km west of Kotovo (the district's administrative centre) by road. Popov is the nearest rural locality.

References 

Rural localities in Kotovsky District